Martin Joseph Blake (born 1853) was an Irish historian who died around 1930.

Blake was a descendant of one of The Tribes of Galway, and some of his noteworthy work was the publication, in two volumes, of much of the extant documents of the Blake family of Galway from 1315 to the 18th century. He was a substantial contributor to the early volumes of the Journal of the Galway Archaeological and Historical Society.

Selected bibliography
 Knockmoy Abbey otherwise called the Monastery of the "Hill of Victory" [Collis Victoriæ]. Notes on its history, and some ancient charters relating to it (hitherto unpublished), in Journal of the Galway Archaeological and Historical Society, i, 1900.
 The successors of St. Jarlath [addenda to Richard J. Kelly's paper, p107], J.G.A.H.S., iii, 1901.
 Blake Family Records, volume one, 1902
 An account of the castle and manor of Bunowen in the Barony of Ballinahinch, County of Galway, and its successive proprietors from the 15th century to the present time, i, 1902
 The Abbey of Athenry, J.G.A.H.S., ii, 1902
 Ballintubber Abbey: notes on its history, ii, 1903
 A transplanter’s decree of final settlement by the Loughrea Commissioners in Cromwell’s time, iii, 1904
 Blake Family Records, volume two, 1905
 The Arms of the Corporate Town of Galway, i, 1905
 Will of Geoffrey French of Galway, A.D. 1528, iv, 1906
 Supplemental list, i, 1907
 Galway Corporation Book B, ii, 1907
 A map of part of the County of Mayo in 1584: With notes thereon and an account of its author, and his descendants, 145-158 [duplicate pagination: 145-148 had already been used in the list of members in No. ii], iv, 1908
 Notes on the persons named in the obituary book of the Franciscan monastery at Galway-(continued) volume 7, i, 1911
 O’Shaughnessy tabular pedigree [Vol. VI, No.i.], Correction, ditto.
 William de Burgh, progenitor of the Burkes in Ireland, volume 7, ii, 1911
 Notes on the place-names mentioned in Browne’s Map of Mayo, 1584 (continued), 39-55, volume 8, i, 1913
 An old Lynch manuscript, volume 8, ii, 1913
 Account of the Lynch family, and of memorable events of the town of Galway, written in 1815 by John, son of Alexander, Lynch, volume 8, iii, 1914
 An old Lynch manuscript (continued) volume 8, iv, 1914
 Field-Marshal Sir John French, ditto.
 Pedigree of Lynch of Lavally, County Galway, volume 10, i & ii, 1917
 The families of French of Duras, Cloghballymore, and Drumharsna, with tabular pedigree, iii & iv, 1918
 corrigendum to D'Arcy pedigree in No. i–ii, ditto.
 Families of Daly in Galway with tabular pedigrees, and four tables, volume 13, iii & iv, 1927.
 The Franciscan convents in Connacht. With notes thereon, ii, volume 14, 1928
 Castle Bourke, formerly Kilboynell Castle in Carra Barony, Co. Mayo, with notes on the history of its ancient owner the clan MacEvilly (Stauntons) and on the history of the family of Bourke, Viscounts Mayo, iii & iv, volume 14, 1929
 The Westport chalice, made by Peter Brown of Westport, for the Austin Convent of Murrisk, in 1724, ditto.
 The Teige Morphy-Margrett ffargus Chalice, 1720, i & ii, volume 15, 1930

References

External links

19th-century Irish historians
20th-century Irish historians
Writers from County Galway
1853 births
1930s deaths
Year of death uncertain